Françoise Thérèse de Voyer de Dorée (fl. 1681) was a French aristocrat.

She was the unofficial lover of king Louis XIV of France in 1681. The affair caused a scandal at court and it was rumoured that Madame de Montespan had arranged it to disturb the relationship between the king and Madame de Maintenon.

References

 K. F. Oelke, Louis XIV and the Land of Love and Adventure: 1679 to 1699

Mistresses of Louis XIV